Biržiška is a surname, and may refer to:

 Mykolas Biržiška, Lithuanian historian of literature, politician, signer of the Act of Independence of Lithuania
 Vaclovas Biržiška (1884–1956), Lithuanian publisher and historian 
Viktoras Biržiška, Mathematician, educator, and encyclopedist